Chinita Ullmann (March 14, 1904 – May 30, 1977), sometimes seen as Chinita Ullman, was a Brazilian dancer, born Frieda Ullmann. "Modern dance was largely introduced to Brazil by Chinita Ullman," notes The Oxford Dictionary of Dance.

Early life 
Frieda Ullmann was born in Porto Alegre, Brazil, the daughter of Emil Paul Friedrich Ullmann and Wanda Wilhelmine Heuser Ullmann. Her father was an immigrant to Brazil from Breslau, Silesia; her maternal grandparents were also German-speaking immigrants to Brazil. Frieda Ullmann took an interest in modern dance, and went to Dresden to study with Mary Wigman.

Career 
Ullmann was a member of Wigman's company from 1925 to 1927. She left the company to perform and tour as a solo artist, using the name "Chinita Ullmann".  She also wrote about dance, and taught modern dance; among her students were German dancer Lotte Berk and her husband, composer Ernst Berk.

Ullmann returned to Brazil in 1932, and was a founder of the Sociedade Pró-Arte Moderna (SPAM), and promoted the Laban method of dance education and dance notation.  She opened a dance school in São Paulo with Kitty Bodenheim. After World War II she taught at the Escola de Arte Dramática. She retired from performing after 1954.

Personal life 
Ullmann died in 1977, aged 73 years, in São Paulo, Brazil. The Prémio Chinita Ullmann is named for her.

References 

1904 births
1977 deaths
People from Porto Alegre
20th-century Brazilian dancers
Brazilian people of German descent